Iratais Point (Nos Iratais \'nos i-ra-'ta-is\) is a point forming both the south extremity and the vertex of the V-shaped Desolation Island situated in the entrance to Hero Bay, Livingston Island, Antarctica.  Separated from Miladinovi Islets to the south by Neck or Nothing Passage.

The feature is named after Kavhan (hereditary viceroy function) Iratais, governor of the southern Bulgarian Black Sea region under Khan Krum the Horrible (9th century AD).

Location

Maps
 L.L. Ivanov et al. Antarctica: Livingston Island and Greenwich Island, South Shetland Islands. Scale 1:100000 topographic map. Sofia: Antarctic Place-names Commission of Bulgaria, 2005.
 L.L. Ivanov. Antarctica: Livingston Island and Greenwich, Robert, Snow and Smith Islands. Scale 1:120000 topographic map.  Troyan: Manfred Wörner Foundation, 2009.  
 Antarctic Digital Database (ADD). Scale 1:250000 topographic map of Antarctica. Scientific Committee on Antarctic Research (SCAR). Since 1993, regularly upgraded and updated.
 L.L. Ivanov. Antarctica: Livingston Island and Smith Island. Scale 1:100000 topographic map. Manfred Wörner Foundation, 2017.

References
 Iratais Point. SCAR Composite Gazetteer of Antarctica
 Bulgarian Antarctic Gazetteer. Antarctic Place-names Commission. (details in Bulgarian, basic data in English)

External links
 Iratais Point. Copernix satellite image

Headlands of Livingston Island
Headlands of Antarctica
Bulgaria and the Antarctic